Stas is a surname, with diacritic variants Staš and Staś.  It may be derived from a diminutive from the given name Stanislav. Notable people with this surname include.
Andrei Stas
Břetislav Staš
Jacques Stas, Belgian former national basketball team player
Jean Stas, Belgian analytical chemist

See also